George Herbert Prouty (March 4, 1862August 18, 1918) of Newport, Vermont, was a Republican member of the Vermont House of Representatives from 1896 to 1897; a member of Vermont State Senate from 1904 to 1906; the 46th lieutenant governor of Vermont from 1906 to 1908; the 52nd governor of Vermont from 1908 to 1910; and Delegate to the 1916 Republican National Convention.

Biography
Born in Newport on March 4, 1862, Prouty was the son of John Azro Prouty and Hannah Barker Lamb Prouty.  Besides his brother Charles, his siblings included brother Harley Hall Prouty and sister Nellie Barker Prouty, and two half-brothers, Edgar John Prouty and Willard Robert Prouty.  Willard Robert Prouty was the father of Winston L. Prouty.

Educated in the public schools of Newport, Prouty attended St. Johnsbury Academy, graduated from Boston's Bryant & Stratton Commercial College, and was employed in the family business, Prouty and Miller, a sawmill and building supply company. He married Henrietta "Nettie" Allen of Rockville, Connecticut, on December 1, 1890. He was the uncle of United States Senator Winston Prouty, and the brother of Charles A. Prouty, Chairman of the Interstate Commerce Commission and the Progressive candidate for US Senator from Vermont in 1914.

Career
Active in the Republican party, he served in the Vermont House of Representatives from 1896 to 1898. From 1904 to 1906 he was a member of the Vermont State Senate and served as Senate President.  Prouty served as Lieutenant Governor from 1906 to 1908.

Prouty was elected on the Republican ticket Governor of Vermont in 1908 and served from October 8, 1908, to October 5, 1910. He favored employers' liability law, and during his administration, the state legislature adopted his suggestion to put the Vermont Railroad Commission under a Public Service Commission designed to supervise all public service corporations. In addition, a State Board of Education and a State Library Commission were founded.

In July 1909, Prouty made news when he posted bail for his chauffeur, who had been accused of striking and killing a St. Hyacinthe, Quebec, man in Burlington during celebrations for the Lake Champlain Tercentenary.

During Prouty's governorship his Secretary of Civil and Military Affairs (chief assistant) was Aaron H. Grout.  Aaron Grout was the son of former Governor Josiah Grout.

Death and legacy
Prouty was killed in Waterville, Quebec, on August 8, 1918, when his chauffeur driven car was hit by a train as he traveled from Newport to Lennoxville, Quebec, to board a train he was going to take to a business meeting in Maine.  He is interred at East Main Street Cemetery, Newport, Vermont.

George Prouty's home was commercially developed and operated for many years as the Governor Prouty Inn, and later turned into senior citizen housing called the Governor Prouty Apartments.

References

External links
 
The Political Graveyard

National Governors Association
Encyclopedia, Vermont Biography

1862 births
1918 deaths
Republican Party governors of Vermont
Republican Party Vermont state senators
Presidents pro tempore of the Vermont Senate
Republican Party members of the Vermont House of Representatives
Lieutenant Governors of Vermont
People from Newport (city), Vermont
Railway accident deaths in Canada
Road incident deaths in Canada
Accidental deaths in Quebec
Burials in Vermont
19th-century American politicians
Bryant and Stratton College alumni